Allenella is a genus of three species of tiny pinhead or dot snails that are endemic to Australia's Lord Howe Island in the Tasman Sea. The genus was first described in 1944 by Tom Iredale.<ref>{{Cite web |title=Australian Faunal Directory: Allenella |url=https://biodiversity.org.au/afd/taxa/Allenella |access-date=2022-05-12 |website=biodiversity.org.au |language=en}}</ref>
 
Species
 Allenella belli Iredale, 1944 – beautiful pinhead snail
 Allenella formalis Iredale, 1944 – brown turban pinhead snail
 Allenella planorum'' Iredale, 1944 – angular pinhead snail

References

 
 

 
 
Gastropod genera
Taxa named by Tom Iredale
Gastropods described in 1944
Gastropods of Lord Howe Island